Movement For! is a liberal political party in Latvia. It is positioned in the centre on the political spectrum. The party was formed in August 2017, and it is one of the members of the Development/For! alliance.

History
Movement For! did not participate in Latvian parliamentary election in 2014, but received representation in the Saeima when Lolita Čigāne, Ints Dālderis, Andrejs Judins and Aleksejs Loskutovs defected from Unity in July 2017, with Čigāne suggesting the Latvian political spectrum needed a centrist, pro-European party. In February 2018, Saeima members Judins and Loskutovs left the "Movement For". Dālderis and Čigāne retired from the party in April 2018, depriving it of its remaining members of parliament.

In June 2018, member of European Parliament Artis Pabriks (former foreign minister and minister of defense of Latvia) defected from Unity to the Movement For, thereby representing the new party in the European Parliament. He continues to sit with the centre-right European People's Party group. Pabriks has also announced to run for the 2018 parliamentary election on the joint list of Latvian Development and Movement For. He was the prime ministerial candidate of Development/For! in the 2018 parliamentary election.

Latvian parliamentary election, 2018

In March 2018, Movement For! formed the Development/For! electoral alliance with two small liberal and pro-European parties, Latvian Development (Latvijas attīstībai) and Growth (Izaugsme), to run in the Latvian parliamentary election in October of the same year together.  The alliance was fully registered on 20 April 2018. The alliance came in 4th in the election and joined the Kariņš cabinet.

The party was accepted as a full member of the Alliance of Liberals and Democrats for Europe in October 2019.

2021 Latvian municipal elections
In November 2020 "Movement For!" announced that in the 2021 Latvian municipal elections, will start with own lists, its identity and program, but there is possibility that in some of the municipalities "Movement For!" will start with a joint list with the parties Latvian Development and Growth.

Currently, "Movement For!" has 13 territorial divisions - Ādaži, Cēsis, Jelgava, Jūrmala, Kuldīga, Liepāja, Mārupe, Ogre, Ropaži, Rīga, Tukums, Valmiera and United Kingdom.

Ideology and policies

Party manifesto

The party's manifesto emphasizes the need for a unity of society, accessible public health care for everyone, rule of law standing over power and fair trial standing over corruption. The manifesto also calls for a reorganization of the powers to counties and cities, state aid for globally sustainable businesses, and addressing the issue of non-citizens in Latvia. Regarding public safety and foreign policy Movement For! seeks for a close cooperation between Latvia and European Union as well as NATO.

Organisation

Leadership

The party's leader from 2017 till now is Daniels Pavļuts, currently Minister of Health  and former Minister of Economics in the Third Dombrovskis cabinet.

From 2017 to 2019 there were a 8 board members: former politician Ilze Viņķele, MP of the Saeima Ints Dālderis, political analyst Marija Golubeva, corporate lawyer Evita Goša, economist Kaspars Briškens, Ventspils State Gymnasium No.1 deputy director Oskars Kaulēns, entrepreneur Mārtiņš Staķis and Ministry of Transport official Andulis Židkovs.

In June 2019 new, bigger board with 11 members was elected: Ilze Viņķele, MP of the Saeima and leader of the Development/For! fraction Marija Golubeva, Chairman of the Riga City Council Mārtiņš Staķis, MP of the Saeima Vita Anda Tērauda,  Parliamentary Secretary of the Ministry of Environmental Protection and Regional Development  Dace Bluķe, MP of the Saeima Mārtiņš Šteins, Head of the Office of the Ministry of Health Vladislava Šķēle, entrepreneur Normunds Mihailovs, DevOp Edgars Jēkabsons and entrepreneur Jevgenijs Lurje.

Election results

Legislative elections

European Parliament elections

References

External links
Official website

Political parties established in 2017
2017 establishments in Latvia
Political parties in Latvia
Pro-European political parties in Latvia
Organisations based in Riga